Fredrik Ludvigsson (born 28 April 1994) is a Swedish professional road cyclist who  rides for Danish UCI Continental team . He is the younger brother of teammate Tobias Ludvigsson.

Biography

2014 season

In March Ludvigsson was 10th overall and fifth in the young rider classification at the Tour de Normandie. In April he was fifth overall in the Triptyque des Monts et Châteaux in Belgium. Ludvigsson the finished 10th overall and won the young rider classification at the Circuit des Ardennes in France. He was 23rd in La Côte Picarde, and finished seventh in the U23 Liège–Bastogne–Liège. Ludvigsson finished 29th in the Rund um Köln. He rode into 16th place overall in the Tour d'Azerbaïdjan in May.

In June Ludvigsson did not finish the Paris–Roubaix Espoirs and came 27th in the Memorial Van Coningsloo before coming 50th overall and 23rd in the young rider classification at the Ronde de l'Oise stage race in France. He finished 44th overall at the Oberösterreich-Rundfahrt in Austria, before travelling to Sweden to compete at the 2014 national road cycling championships where he was 15th in the individual time trial and fourth in the road race. In August he began as a stagiaire at the Dutch UCI ProTeam  for the remainder of their season. Ludvigsson did not finish the Tour Alsace or the Antwerpse Havenpijl but came 77th overall and 40th in the young rider classification at the Arctic Race of Norway. He then had some mediocre results in one day races in the 2014 UCI Europe Tour and finished his season with a 75th place at the Gooikse Pijl in Belgium. This was partly due to an injury in his leg, which was operated on after the Gooikse Pijl.

2015 season
Ludvigsson joined the now German  with a two-year contract for the 2015 season.

2016 season
On 23 January 2016, he was one of the six members of the Team Giant–Alpecin who were hit by a car which drove into on-coming traffic while they were training in Spain. All riders were in stable condition.

Major results

2011
3rd National Time Trial Championships
2012
2nd Overall Trofeo Karlsberg
7th Overall Course de la Paix Juniors
1st Mountains Classification
10th Overall GP Général Patton
2013
1st  Overall Boucle de l'Artois
1st  Points classification
1st Stage 2 (ITT)
2nd Overall Tour of Estonia
1st  Young rider classification
4th Hadeland GP
5th Overall Tour de Normandie
2014
4th National Championships Road Race
5th Overall Le Triptyque des Monts et Châteaux
7th U23 Liège–Bastogne–Liège
10th Overall Circuit des Ardennes
1st  Young rider classification
10th Overall Tour de Normandie

References

External links

Fredrik Ludvigsson profile at Giant-Alpecin

Swedish male cyclists
Living people
1994 births
People from Jönköping
Sportspeople from Jönköping County